Blekinge County is a county or län in the south of Sweden. It borders the Counties of Skåne, Kronoberg, Kalmar and the Baltic Sea. The capital is Karlskrona. It is the smallest of the present administrative counties of Sweden, covering only 0,7% of the total area of the country.

Province

Blekinge, the historical province Blekinge, has virtually the same boundaries as the current administrative entity, Blekinge County.

Administration
Blekinge County was a part of Kalmar County between 1680 and 1683, due to the foundation of the naval base at Karlskrona.

The main aim of the County Administrative Board is to fulfil the goals set in national politics by the Riksdag and the Government, to coordinate the interests and promote the development of the county, to establish regional goals and safeguard the due process of law in the handling of each case. The County Administrative Board is a Government Agency headed by a Governor. See List of Blekinge Governors.

Heraldry
The County of Blekinge inherited its coat of arms from the province of Blekinge. When it is shown with a royal crown it represents the County Administrative Board.

Politics

Blekinge county council, or Region Blekinge, is a municipal entity that is independent of, but coterminous with, the County Administrative Board. Its main responsibilities lie in health care and public transportation issues for the county.

Riksdag elections
The table details all Riksdag election results of Blekinge County since the unicameral era began in 1970. The blocs denote which party would support the Prime Minister or the lead opposition party towards the end of the elected parliament.

Governors

The current governor of Blekinge County is Swedish Social Democratic Party politician Ulrica Messing, appointed on the 1st of October 2021.

Municipalities

Population as of 2009-12-31
Blekinge county total 152 591, 1.6% of the nation.

Karlshamn 30 919
Karlskrona 63 342
Olofström 13 102
Ronneby 28 416
Sölvesborg 16 813

Localities in order of size
The five most populous localities of Blekinge County in 2020:

Villages
 

Olsäng

Demographics

Foreign background 
SCB have collected statistics on backgrounds of residents since 2002. These tables consist of all who have two foreign-born parents or are born abroad themselves. The chart lists election years and the last year on record alone.

References

External links

 Blekinge County Administrative Board
 Blekinge County Council
 Regional Association of Blekinge

 
Counties of Sweden
County
States and territories established in 1683
1683 establishments in Sweden